Baptiste Vignes  (15 April 1985 – 12 April 2022) was a french pilot, instructor, and international aerobatics champion.

Biography 
Vignes grew up in Le Havre and obtained his pilot's license at the Le Havre's Jean-Maridor flying club at a young age. He then trained as an aerobatic pilot at the Bernay-Saint-Martin flying club in the Eure department. He died with Simon de la Bretèche following the crash of Aura Aero's "Integral R" aerobatic aircraft prototype during a flight test. An investigation by the French State Aviation Safety Accident Investigation Board was started, as well as a judicial investigation by the Ariège Gendarmerie  and the Gendarmerie of air transport.

Career 
In 2012, Vignes worked an instructor and aerobatic coach in Dijon. One year later, he became chief pilot at Top Gun Voltige, a recreational flying company. In 2017 he was recruited by Red Bull to participate in the Red Bull Air Race World Championship as a contestant for the 2017 season. In 2018 he became an instructor at the Bernay-Saint-Martin flying club. In 2019, he joined the flight test team at Aura Aero, a French aerospace manufacturer.

Achievements 
Source:

With the french national team

Individual

References 

Aerobatic pilots
1985 births
2022 deaths